Nadi Adab Riadhi Baladiate Réghaia , known as NARB Réghaïa  or simply NARBR for short, is an Algerian football club based in Réghaïa (in the outskirts of Alger). The club was founded in 1945 and its colors are black and white. Their home stadium, the Stade Boualem Bourada, has a capacity of some 3,000 spectators. The club is currently playing in the Ligue Nationale du Football Amateur.

External links
  LNF Profile
  DZFoot Profile

Association football clubs established in 1945
Football clubs in Algeria
Narb Reghaia
1945 establishments in Algeria
Sports clubs in Algeria